María Luisa Pérez-Caballero Moltó (1923–1995), commonly known by her stage name Marilú Elízaga, was a Spanish actress of theatre, television, and film.

In 1958, she was nominated for an Ariel Award for Best Actress for the film La culta dama, directed by Rogelio A. González.

Selected filmography
Los ricos también lloran (1979)

References

External links

1923 births
1995 deaths
Spanish stage actresses
Spanish television actresses
Spanish film actresses
20th-century Spanish actresses